Pelmatoplana is a genus of land planarians in the tribe Pelmatoplanini.

Description 
The genus Pelmatoplana includes planarians with weak cutaneous longitudinal musculature and strong parenchymal musculature forming a ring zone. The copulatory apparatus has a well-developed conical penis papilla and the female atrium lacks a seminal bursa, having only the female canal entering it. A genito-intestinal duct may be present connecting the female canal to the intestine.

Species 
The genus Pelmatoplana includes the following species:

Pelmatoplana bogoriensis Graff, 1899
Pelmatoplana braueri (Graff, 1899)
Pelmatoplana graffi Fuhrmann, 1914
Pelmatoplana japonica (Kaburaki, 1922)
Pelmatoplana maheensis (Graff, 1899)
Pelmatoplana moluccana Graff, 1899
Pelmatoplana pseudophallus de Beauchamp, 1939

References 

Geoplanidae
Rhabditophora genera